Platylesches chamaeleon, the chamaeleon hopper, is a butterfly in the family Hesperiidae. It is found in Senegal, Guinea, Sierra Leone, Liberia, Ivory Coast, Ghana, Nigeria, the Central African Republic, Uganda, Tanzania, Zambia and possibly Niger. The habitat probably consists of forests and gallery forests.

Subspecies
Platylesches chamaeleon chamaeleon (Senegal, Guinea, Sierra Leone, Liberia, Ivory Coast, Ghana, Nigeria, Central African Republic, Zambia, possibly Niger)
Platylesches chamaeleon tero Evans, 1937 (western Uganda, north-western Tanzania)

References

Butterflies described in 1891
Erionotini
Butterflies of Africa